The  Philadelphia Soul season was the seventh season for the franchise in the Arena Football League. The team was coached by Doug Plank and played their home games at Wells Fargo Center. The Soul had the best record in the league at 15–3, and were able to advance to ArenaBowl XXV. However, they would be defeated by the Arizona Rattlers by a 72–54 score.

Standings

Schedule

Regular season
The Soul had a bye week during the season's opening week, and began the season in week 2 on the road against the New Orleans VooDoo on March 18. Their first home game was on April 1 against the Cleveland Gladiators. They hosted the Utah Blaze on July 22 to conclude the regular season.

Playoffs

References

Philadelphia Soul
Philadelphia Soul seasons
Philadelphia Soul